The Bahamas women's national under-16 and under-17 basketball team is a national basketball team of the Bahamas, administered by the Bahamas Basketball Federation.

It represents the country in international under-16 and under-17 (under age 16 and under age 17) women's basketball competitions.

It appeared at the Centrobasket U17 Championship for Women.

See also
Bahamas women's national basketball team
Bahamas women's national under-19 basketball team
Bahamas men's national under-17 basketball team

References

External links
Bahamas Basketball Records at FIBA Archive

Bahamas national basketball team
Women's national under-17 basketball teams